Quiçama (Portuguese spelling), Quissama or Kisama (Bantu spelling) is one of the nine municípios (city council
or municipality) that make up the province of Luanda, as per the new administrative division of the province (the others being, Luanda, Belas, Cazenga, Cacuaco, Viana and Icolo e Bengo).
The municipal seat is the village of Muxima.

Quiçama is bordered to the north by the municipalities of Viana and Icolo e Bengo, to the east by the municipalities of Cambambe, Libolo and Quibala, to the south by the municipalities of Quilenda and Porto Amboim, and to the west by the Atlantic Ocean.

Part of the municipality is occupied by the Quiçama National Park.

History
In the 1580s Kafuxi ka Mbari was the recognized defender of this area. In the 1580s he and the Portuguese based out of Luanda asserted his authority here. In 1594 Francisco de Almeida with the support of Pedro Alvares Rebello waged warfare to remove Kafuxi ka Mbari from power. Kafuxi ka Mbari defeated the forces under Almeida.

Administrative division
The municipality of Quiçama is made up of five comunas (communes), as follows:
 Cabo Ledo
 Demba Chio
 Mumbondo
 Muxima
 Quixinge

References

Municipalities in Luanda
Populated places in Luanda Province